KMFM is a network of radio stations that was formed from the merger of seven Independent Local Radio stations and one digital station (on the Kent Digital Multiplex) owned by the KM Group, broadcasting to the county of Kent in the United Kingdom. Whilst the station broadcasts as one countywide station, it is officially eight separate licenses.

KMFM offers its listeners local news and music. KMFM plays a mix of music, mainly covering the current Top 40 hits after adopting a contemporary hit radio format in 2012. The previous KMFM format had been aimed at an older audience.

As of December 2022, the network broadcasts to a combined audience of 198,000, according to RAJAR.

Original stations
When the original stations were rebranded, KMFM operated each of the seven stations locally on FM throughout Kent, with one county-wide station on DAB on the NOW Kent multiplex. Apart from KMFM Ashford, each station was previously independent before being bought by the KM Group and rebranded.

Programming

All KMFM stations adopted a common programming in March 2012. The previous local breakfast DJs had been made redundant following the close of their breakfast shows the previous Friday, and all other shows presented by them were also removed from the network.

KMFM Extra, until then a separate station with a unique schedule, was closed down in June 2012 and replaced on DAB with the regular KMFM service. Each area however still offers local advertisements and sponsorships (in the case of the DAB and online services, countywide adverts are heard).

Originally each station produced its own programming during daytime. Apart from Medway, from 2007 each station grouped with its neighbour (West Kent and Maidstone; Canterbury and Thanet; Ashford and Shepway and White Cliffs Country) to network programmes between 11am and 7pm. The programmes were merged in April 2009 to create two groups with their own networked programming  – West (Maidstone, Medway and West Kent) and East (Ashford, Canterbury, Shepway and White Cliffs Country and Thanet). At other times (evenings and weekends) programming was broadcast across all seven stations.

In September 2009, KMFM was given permission to network all its programmes apart from Monday to Saturday breakfast, and Sunday afternoons. Saturday breakfast and Sunday afternoons were networked in 2010. Breakfast shows for KMFM Maidstone and KMFM West Kent were merged in January 2011.

Studios
Originally all seven stations broadcast from studios within their transmission area. KMFM Canterbury moved to the Ashford studio in 2008, and KMFM Shepway and White Cliffs Country joined it in April 2009. KMFM Thanet broadcast from Cliftonville near Margate (having been relocated from Margate harbour). All three stations in the west network broadcast from Medway. Each station has however retained its sales teams within the transmission area.

Since the merger of all stations, all programmes are produced and broadcast from the Medway studios. The Ashford and Cliftonville studios have been closed.

News service
Initially, each station provided an independent service during peak hours from their respective newsrooms.

Local bulletins have since been superseded by a county-wide bulletin. This system operates from 6am until 6pm on weekdays and 8am until 1pm on weekends; outside of those hours, KMFM's off-peak news service is provided by Sky News Radio. News bulletins are provided on the hour from the Medway studios; previously the Canterbury studio had been the news hub until this closed in 2009.

Bulletins were also provided at 7.30am, 8.30am, 4.30pm and 5.30pm on weekdays. The half-past bulletins started in September 2006 to replace extended news bulletins at the top of the hour. This ended in autumn 2011 before being restarted in mid-2012.

References

External links
 KMFM

 
British radio networks
Mass media in Kent
KM Group